Seven Men from Now (also billed as 7 Men from Now) is a 1956 American Western film directed by Budd Boetticher and starring Randolph Scott, Gail Russell and Lee Marvin. The film was written by Burt Kennedy and produced by John Wayne's Batjac Productions.

Plot
Ben Stride walks into a desert cave encampment during a nighttime rainstorm. He encounters two men taking shelter next to a fire and asks to join them. Stride tells the men he is from the town of Silver Springs, which provokes a mysterious reaction from the two men. They discuss a robbery and murder that recently occurred there. When Stride realizes who the men are, he guns them down.

While tracking through the Arizona wilderness, Stride comes upon a wagon stuck in the mud. Stride helps pull the wagon clear, and the wagon's owners, John and Annie Greer, are grateful. Travelers from Kansas City, they admit they are inexperienced at frontier life and ask Stride to ride with them as they head south to the border town of Flora Vista on their way west to California. Greer says he hopes to find a sales job there, but has been taking odd jobs along the way. The mention of Flora Vista arouses Stride's curiosity and he agrees to take them to the border. As the trio travels, Annie shows a growing attraction to Stride. At one point they are stopped by a US Army detail, whose commanding officer tells them to go back, as Chiricahua Apache have been spotted in the area and he cannot guarantee their safety.

Stride and the Greers travel on to a stagecoach relay station where they encounter Bill Masters and Clete, two former nemeses of Stride's. As they all spend the night at the station, Masters tells the Greers that Stride was once the sheriff of Silver Springs, and his wife was killed during the robbery of the Wells Fargo freight office. Stride has been tracking and killing the seven men who performed the robbery, and Masters intends to abscond with the $20,000 in gold they stole once Stride has accomplished his task. Annie feels sympathy for Stride, who confesses that he feels guilty about his wife's death because at the time he was no longer sheriff and too proud to take the deputy job, so she took one as a clerk at the freight office. Before the wagon heads out of the station, with Masters and Clete tagging along opportunistically, they are met by Chiricahua warriors. The Apache leave when Stride gives up one of the horses to the hungry tribesmen.

The group encounters one of the Wells Fargo robbers, who is being chased by Indians. Unaware of the man's part in the robbery, Stride saves him from the Apache. The man, however, recognizes Stride and nearly kills him, but Stride is saved when Masters shoots the man in the back.

Masters and Clete reach Flora Vista ahead of the wagon, and they meet with the Wells Fargo bandits waiting for delivery of their gold. Masters tells their leader, Payte Bodeen, that Stride is heading in their direction to kill all of them and avenge his wife's death. Bodeen dispatches two of the bandits to meet Stride before he can reach Flora Vista. Meanwhile, Stride leaves Greer and Annie, telling them to continue on without him. Stride rides ahead into a canyon alone and is ambushed by the two bank robbers but kills them both. Wounded in the leg, Stride is knocked unconscious while trying to ride away with one of the bandits' horses.

The Greers’ find Stride while still unconscious  and tend to him. Stride regains consciousness and overhears Greer admitting to his wife that he was paid $500 to deliver the Wells Fargo box containing the gold to Flora Vista. Stride takes the gold away from Greer to draw the rest of the bandits out from town, and Greer and Annie head into Flora Vista to notify the local sheriff.

Greer arrives in town without the gold, telling Bodeen that Stride has it, and as he walks down the street toward the sheriff's office, Bodeen guns him down. The last two bandits, Bodeen and Clint, ride out to confront Stride. Stride shoots Clint but Bodeen is killed by Masters and Clete. Masters, blinded by greed, then kills Clete and walks out into the clearing where Stride has placed the box of gold. They face off, and Stride kills Masters before he can pull his guns.

Stride returns the gold to Wells Fargo and tells Annie that he is going to take a job as a deputy sheriff in Silver Springs. He puts her on a stagecoach bound for California, then rides away. Annie, however, tells the stage driver she is not going.

Cast
 Randolph Scott as Ben Stride
 Gail Russell as Annie Greer
 Lee Marvin as Bill Masters
 Walter Reed as John Greer
 John Larch as Payte Bodeen (1 of the seven men)
 Don 'Red' Barry as Clete (Bill Master's guy)
 Fred Graham as Henchman (1 of the seven men)
 John Beradino as Clint (1 of the seven men)
 John Phillips as Jed (1 of the seven men)
 Chuck Roberson as Mason (1 of the seven men)
 Stuart Whitman as Cavalry Lt. Collins
 Pamela Duncan as Señorita Nellie
 Steve Mitchell as Fowler (1 of the seven men)
 Cliff Lyons as Henchman (1 of the seven men)
 Chet Brandenburg as Townsman (uncredited) 
 Chick Hannan as Townsman (uncredited) 
 Cap Somers as Townsman (uncredited) 
 George Sowards as Stage Driver (uncredited) 
 Fred Sherman as The Prospector

Production
John Wayne and Robert Fellows's production company Batjac purchased the Burt Kennedy screenplay with the intention of having Wayne star as Stride. It was Kennedy's first film script. However, Wayne was locked into doing The Searchers for John Ford. According to Kennedy, Wayne wasn't particularly interested in the script until he became aware that Robert Mitchum's representatives were interested in it, at which point Wayne perked up and suggested going to Warners and casting Randolph Scott instead.  Scott insisted on Budd Boetticher as the director. As with their previous collaboration, Bullfighter and the Lady, Wayne, in his role as producer, recut Seven Men From Now without Boetticher's approval, although it has since been restored to the director's original vision.

Seven Men from Now was the first in a seven-film collaboration between Scott, Boetticher, and producer Harry Joe Brown, with five of the films written by Kennedy.

The movie was shot in the Alabama Hills and other locations near Lone Pine, California in the last months of 1955. Gail Russell was cast as the female lead due to her previous work with Wayne in Angel and the Badman and Wake of the Red Witch, in which Wayne's wife at the time accused them of having an affair (denied by both and rejected by the court during Wayne's divorce proceedings). She had not worked on a movie for nearly five years prior to Seven Men from Now, due to her struggles with stage-fright-induced alcoholism. Boetticher worked very hard to keep her from drinking during the filming.

See also
 List of American films of 1956

References

External links
 
 
 

1956 Western (genre) films
1956 films
American Western (genre) films
American films about revenge
American survival films
Batjac Productions films
Films directed by Budd Boetticher
Films produced by John Wayne
Films shot in Lone Pine, California
Warner Bros. films
1950s English-language films
1950s American films